Many countries have had dedicated railway services for the delivery of postal mail.

Examples include:

 In Australia, the Travelling post office, Queensland

  in Berlin
  in Munich
 In Switzerland, the  has run since 1847
 In the United Kingdom, the Travelling Post Office (1830–2004) was a service where post was sorted en route
 The London Post Office Railway (1927–2003) operated in dedicated tunnels under London
 In the United States, the Railway Mail Service (1862–1978) of the United States Postal Service carried the vast majority of mail from the 1890s until the 1960s
 The Railway Mail Service used railway post offices within passenger services to sort post en route
 The use of the Chicago Tunnel Company for mail freight inspired the London Post Office Railway